Election 2 (literal title: Black Society: Harmony is a Virtue), also known as Triad Election in the United States, is a 2006 Category III Hong Kong crime film directed by Johnnie To with a large ensemble cast including Louis Koo, Simon Yam and Nick Cheung. A sequel to the 2005 film Election, the film concludes the events of the first film centring on triad boss Lok, who struggles to get re-elected as his two-year term approaches its end. He faces competition from Jimmy, who wants to retire from the triad to be a legitimate businessman, but gets drawn into the conflict surrounding the election.

Election 2 enjoyed box office success in Hong Kong and being shown as an "Official Selection" at the 2006 Cannes Film Festival. Afterwards, it became a popular hit on the international festival circuit.

Stephen Teo, author of Director in Action: Johnnie To and the Hong Kong Action Film (2007), wrote that "Election 2 is the most directly political film made in Hong Kong in the post-97 era."

Plot 
Lok, who was elected chairman of the Hong Kong triad Wo Lin Shing at the end of the first film, contemplates breaking tradition by seeking to be re-elected for a second term once his two-year term expires. He faces challenge from his protégés Jimmy, Kun and Jet.

Jimmy has been trying to distance himself from the triad's criminal activities and focus on legitimate businesses in Hong Kong and Mainland China. During a trip to Guangzhou, Jimmy gets arrested by the Mainland Chinese police and meets Assistant Police Chief Shi, who makes a deal with him: If Jimmy wants to continue doing business in Mainland China, he must become Wo Lin Shing's next chairman and help the police maintain peace and order among the triads. Jimmy reluctantly accepts the offer and becomes one of the candidates in the upcoming election.

Lok negotiates with Kun and convinces Kun to team up with him for the election, claiming that the triad elders will support them. Kun then kidnaps Jimmy's business partner Mr Kwok and hides him in a coffin together with Big-Head. Lok also sends Jet to assassinate Jimmy but Jet fails. Jimmy lets Jet go but warns him that Lok will get rid of him too eventually. Meanwhile, Lok takes the Dragonhead Baton, the symbol of the chairman's authority, and hides it in Guangzhou. He also murders triad elder Uncle Teng when the latter criticises him for breaking tradition and becoming too greedy for power.

In the face of an escalating conflict, Jimmy and his supporters kidnap Lok's lieutenants and intimidate or bribe them into siding with him. Jimmy also exposes Kun for kidnapping Mr Kwok and Big-Head, causing Kun to go on the run from the police. He then orders Lok's lieutenants to murder Lok when Lok is exhausted after chasing his estranged teenage son. With his opponents eliminated, Jimmy wins the election and becomes Wo Lin Shing's chairman.

When Jimmy visits Guangzhou again, Assistant Police Chief Shi congratulates him on his victory and passes him the Dragonhead Baton, which the police have seized. He also tells Jimmy that he hopes that Jimmy will serve as Wo Lin Shing's chairman indefinitely so that the triad becomes a "family enterprise". Jimmy, who had initially hoped to go "clean" once his two-year term expires so that his family will not be affected by his association with the triad, is furious and horrified to hear that. When he learns that his wife is now pregnant, he contemplates how his family is going to be stuck in a life they do not want to be in.

Cast 

 Louis Koo as Jimmy Lee
 Simon Yam as Lam Lok
 Nick Cheung as Jet
 Gordon Lam as Kun
 Cheung Siu-fai as So
 Lam Suet as Big-Head
 Wong Tin-lam as Uncle Teng
 Mark Cheng as Bo
 Andy On as Lik
 You Yong as Assistant Police Chief Shi
 Alan Chui Chung-San as Uncle Tank

Release
The film did not get a Mainland Chinese release, unlike the first film.

Reception

Festivals
The film first appeared at the 2006 Hong Kong International Film Festival. Election 2 was also shown in "Out of Competition" (midnight screenings) section at the 2006 Cannes Film Festival, where the movie was very well received by international critics. Afterward, Election 2 became a popular hit on the international film festival circuit.
 Official Selection of 2006 Cannes Film Festival (Out-of-Competition midnight screening)
 Official Selection of Toronto International Film Festival, New York Film Festival, Pusan International Film Festival, Festival de Cine de Sitges, Chicago International Film Festival, Melbourne International Film Festival, Stockholm International Film Festival, Torino Film Festival, AFI Fest, Tokyo Filmex, Palm Springs International Film Festival, Santa Barbara International Film Festival, Rotterdam Film Festival, Mar del Plata Film Festival, Philadelphia Film Festival, Indianapolis International Film Festival, Moscow International Film Festival, Locarno International Film Festival.

Hong Kong distribution
  Election 2 opened in Hong Kong on 27 April 2006 and grossed about HK$13.57 million domestically; it was less than the first film's earnings of HK$15.89 million, but HK$13.57 million was still quite high for a movie which received a Category III rating (18+ restriction) in Hong Kong.
 The film was named best film of 2006 in the Hong Kong Film Critics Society Awards.
 In 2007, the film was nominated for the following Hong Kong Film Awards: Best Film, Best Director, Best Screenplay, Best Supporting Actor (Simon Yam) and Best Supporting Actor (Nick Cheung).

Worldwide distribution
Election 2 was sold to more than 21 territories, including Tartan Films for the United States, Optimum Releasing for the United Kingdom, ARP Selection for France, A-Film Distribution for Netherlands, Ripley's Film for Italy, Avalon Productions for Spain, NonStop Entertainment for Scandinavia, Maywin Media for Russia, Fine Films for Japan, Hopscotch Films for Australia, California Filmes in Brazil and 791cine for Argentina.

In May 2006, Tartan Films acquired all United States distribution rights of Election 2. Tartan Films released this movie in the US theatrically under the new title Triad Election on 25 April 2007. Despite receiving very little promotion, in the United States, the film still had the highest per-screen average box office on the weekend it opened.

Critical reception
Election 2 received generally positive reviews, with a 96% "Fresh" rating on Rotten Tomatoes. In addition, it was ranked one of the top films of 2007 on Metacritic with a score of 83 out of 100. Manohla Dargis of The New York Times wrote that the movie is an "exemplary gangster thriller."

References

External links
Official website (US)
IONCINEMA.com interviews Johnnie To
Election 2 at LoveHKFilm.com
Official MySpace page (US)
US movie trailer  (QuickTime)
Hong Kong movie trailer (QuickTime)
Review at Kaiju Shakedown, which is Variety'''s Asian cinema blog
Review at HKCuk.co.uk
Review at VarietyReview at The Hollywood Reporter''
 
 
 

2006 films
2000s crime thriller films
2006 action films
Triad films
2000s Cantonese-language films
Milkyway Image films
Films directed by Johnnie To
Films with screenplays by Yau Nai-hoi
2000s Hong Kong films